Zarumilla is a city in the Tumbes Region, in northwestern Peru. It has a population of 54,625 as of 2019, and is the capital of the Zarumilla Province. It is also the main settlement in the Zarumilla District. It is located only a few kilometers away from the border town of Aguas Verdes, which is connected to Ecuador by a bridge.

The city's surroundings were the location of the eponymous battle that took place from July 23 to 31 during the 1941 Ecuadorian–Peruvian War. Its economy is focused on farming and the city serves today as a route of international trade with Ecuador.

References

Populated places in Peru